The Snowball may refer to:
 The Snowball: Warren Buffett and the Business of Life
 The Snowball (children's novel)

See also
 Snowball (disambiguation)